Kurt Stockton (born October 17, 1965 in Santa Barbara, California) is a former American cyclist.

Palmares
1990
 National Road Race Champion
1st International Cycling Classic
3rd Philadelphia International Championship
1991
1st stage 1 Redlands Bicycle Classic

References

1965 births
Living people
People from Santa Barbara, California
American male cyclists